Morris Edward Opler (May 3, 1907 – May 13, 1996), American anthropologist and advocate of Japanese American civil rights, was born in Buffalo, New York.  He was the brother of Marvin Opler, an anthropologist and social psychiatrist.

Morris Opler's chief anthropological contribution is in the ethnography of Southern Athabaskan peoples, i.e. the Navajo and Apache, such as the Chiricahua, Mescalero, Lipan, and Jicarilla.  His classic work is An Apache Life-Way (1941). He worked with Grenville Goodwin, who was also studying social organization among the Western Apache.  After Goodwin's early death, Opler edited a volume of his letters from the field and other papers, published in 1973.

Opler earned his Ph.D. from the University of Chicago in 1933.  He taught at Reed College in Portland, Oregon, and the Claremont Colleges in Claremont, California, during the 1940s and later taught at Cornell University and the University of Oklahoma.

During World War II, Opler worked as a community analyst at the Manzanar concentration camp, documenting conditions in camp and the daily lives of its Japanese American inmates. Arriving in 1943, he was sympathetic toward the displaced Japanese Americans and frequently butt heads with camp administrators, covering the so-called "Manzanar Riot" and resistance to the unpopular "loyalty questionnaire" and conscription of men from camp.

He also aided the defense of Gordon Hirabayashi and Fred Korematsu in their (unsuccessful) cases challenging the legality of the exclusion of Japanese Americans from the West Coast, writing an amicus brief for each case that argued the military necessity cited by Western Defense Command head John L. DeWitt was in fact based "on racial grounds."

In his published works, he challenged the way American public schools teach about Japanese Americans, and fought to improve the way they were viewed by Americans.

Notable Accomplishments 

Morris Edward Opler was not the first to anthropologically study and work with the Apache people, nor was he the sole voice contributing to their historical narrative. He readily acknowledged the accomplishments of others who studied his same field of interest. However, he was a highly influential leader in Native American and Japanese-American anthropology, and he achieved many noteworthy accomplishments in his work.

Opler was highly educated. After earning a bachelor's degree and a master's degree from the University of Buffalo, he received his doctorate from the University of Chicago. At the same time that he was working toward his Ph.D., he was starting down the path of his impactful anthropological fieldwork and research among the Apache people. This research inspired his dissertation, entitled "An Analysis of Mescalero and Chiricahua Apache Social Organization in the Light of Their Systems of Relationships," which he presented in 1932.

Ten years later, in 1942, while Opler was working at Claremont College, he was awarded a Fellowship grant from the John Simon Guggenheim Memorial Foundation as a result of his research among the Apache people during the decade prior.

Just a year after receiving that honor from the Guggenheim Memorial Foundation, Opler began working with the American Office of War Information, doing anthropological work with the Japanese Americans kept in concentration camps during World War II (more specifically in the Manzanar War Relocation Center) as a result of the United States government's distrust of Japanese loyalty to America. Opler showed compassion toward the Japanese internees and even wrote a few legal briefs on behalf of Japanese American individuals, two of which were significant enough to be heard by the United States Supreme Court. In part because of Opler's work, the Supreme Court ruled in 1945 that the Japanese internees were being held and treated unconstitutionally, and after that they were filtered back into everyday society.

In 1949, after he had completed his research and work at Manzanar in California, Opler returned to New York and accepted a position at Cornell University. During his twenty years there, motivated by his past experiences researching Japanese culture in the camps during WWII, he established a new program for the Cornell students that was dedicated to Asian Studies.

Career Path 
Morris Edward Opler worked actively in his field for almost 50 years. His anthropological fieldwork began in 1931, when he began doing fieldwork in New Mexico among the Mescalero Apache tribe. He had a lifelong interest in the indigenous people of western America, specifically the Apache, and consistently focused his studies on their lifestyles and practices. In addition to his anthropological studies, Opler entered the world of academia, working as a professor for many years, beginning in 1937, when he was employed at Reed College. This occupation was followed by positions at Claremont College, Harvard University, Cornell University, and finally, at the University of Oklahoma, after he had retired from Cornell University in 1969. Interspersed between these academic positions, Opler also worked for the Office of War Information (1943–1946) and at the Manzanar War Relocation Center during WWII. After retiring a second time, this time from the University of Oklahoma in 1977, he dedicated his time to writing and publishing articles relating to the conditions of Apache life.

Views and Beliefs 
Opler had strong beliefs and opinions, and he was not afraid to make them known. He fought back in writing, often harshly and in a way that excited opposition, against those he disagreed with.

Politically, he had an aversion to Marxist and Communist ideals and spoke out against them. This makes sense in the context of his career, because he lived in a time when the United States was experiencing a widespread paranoia surrounding Marxism, and anthropologists were often the group found most guilty of engaging in Marxist mindsets and practices.

Anthropologically, he believed in observing cultural practices and beliefs without judgment or bias (a practice known as cultural relativity). He defended the people he studied. For example, while he was working at the Manzanar War Relocation Center, he showed great sympathy for the Japanese people who were kept there. He was a strong advocate for their rights and comfort while he studied and wrote about their culture.

Opler believed that studies of culture should be independent of studies of biology. He believed that the unchanging nature of human biology and the constant evolution of culture would contradict each other if attempts were made to study them in tandem. Because of this belief that differences in culture didn't come from differences in biology, Opler was racially tolerant and didn't believe one race was biologically superior. This racial tolerance would lead him to dedicate so much of his research efforts to marginalized ethnic groups, namely the Native Americans and the Japanese.

Famous Publications 
A majority of Opler's research was done on Native American groups of the American Southwest. He studied specifically the Chiricahua Indians, who were the subjects of his two most famous books, An Apache Life-Way and Myths and Tales of the Chiricahua Apache Indians.

An Apache Life-Way: The Economic, Social, and Religious Institutions of the Chiricahua Indians was one of Opler’s most famous publications. He studied many Native American groups, but the Apache were a main focus of his. The book goes through the life of an Apache year by year. Rather than a history, this book explains the day to day Apache experience, going in chronological order of one’s life. The lifestyle described in the book is from a time before the Americans started the long era of hostile interactions with the Apache.

The people designated as “Apache” in this book are those who spoke the Apache language in the area that is now New Mexico, Arizona, Sonora, and Chihuahua. There were many smaller sub-groups that populated these areas, three of them different groups of the Chiricahua Apache.

The books is divided into several main parts: Childhood; Maturation; Social Relations of Adults; Folk Beliefs, Medical Practice, and Shamanism; Maintenance of the Household; Marital and Sexual Life; The Round of Life; Political Organization and Status; and Death, Mourning, and the Underworld. Each section is divided into more specific subcategories that explore each phase of life and the rituals associated with it.

In Myths and Tales of the Chiricahua Apache Indians Opler describes the mythology and beliefs of the Chiricahua Apache. It contains religious stories, as well as historical tales passed down for generations by the Apache. Opler believed that studying the mythology of a people was one of the best ways to understand the roots of their culture. With each of the peoples he studied throughout his career as an anthropologist, he made an effort to become familiar with the folklore of the people.

The book is divided into six main parts, each containing several subcategories and chapters: When the Earth Was New; the Contest for Daylight; The Coyote Cycle and Other Animal, Bird, and Insect Tales; Stories of Supernatural Beings and Encounters with Supernaturals; Stories of Foolish People, Unfaithfulness, and Perversion; and Miscellaneous.

While writing these books, he interviewed several Apache in order to get the truth from their perspective. He consulted with them on the contents of the books, and spent a lot of time with them in order to better understand their culture before publishing about it.

Bibliography 
 Basso, Keith H.; & Opler, Morris E. (Eds.). (1971). Apachean culture history and ethnology. Anthropological papers of the University of Arizona (No. 21). Tucson: University of Arizona Press.
 Castetter, Edward F.; & Opler, Morris E.  (1936).  The Ethnobiology of the Chiricahua and Mescalero Apache: The Use of Plants for Foods, Beverages and Narcotics, Ethnobiological studies in the American Southwest, (Vol. 3); Biological series (Vol. 4, No. 5); Bulletin, University of New Mexico, whole, (No. 297).  Albuquerque: University of New Mexico Press.
 Goodwin, Grenville; & Opler, Morris E.  (1973).  Grenville Goodwin among the Western Apache: Letters from the Field.  Tucson: University of Arizona Press.  .
 Hoijer, Harry; & Opler, Morris E.  (1938).  Chiricahua and Mescalero Apache Texts.  The University of Chicago Publications in Anthropology; Linguistic series.  Chicago: University of Chicago Press.  (Reprinted 1964 by Chicago: University of Chicago Press; in 1970 by Chicago: University of Chicago Press; & in 1980 under H. Hoijer by New York: AMS Press).
 Opler, Morris E.  (1932). An Analysis of Mescalero and Chiricahua Apache Social Organization in the Light of Their Systems of Relationship. (Unpublished doctoral dissertation, University of Chicago)
 
 
 Opler, Morris E.  (1937).  "An Outline of Chiricahua Apache Social Organization", In F. Egan (Ed.), Social Anthropology of North American Tribes (pp. 173–242). Chicago: University of Chicago Press.
 
 Opler, Morris E. (1938). "Myths and Tales of the Jicarilla Apache Indians", Memoirs of the American Folklore Society (No. 31). New York.
 
 Opler, Morris E. (1940). Myths and Legends of the Lipan Apache. Memoirs of the American Folklore Society (Vol. 36). New York: American Folklore Society, J. J. Augustin.
 Opler, Morris E.  (1941).  An Apache Life-way: The Economic, Social, and Religious Institutions of the Chiricahua Indians.  Chicago: The University of Chicago Press.  (Reprinted 1962 by Chicago: University of Chicago Press; 1965 by New York: Cooper Square Publishers; 1965 by Chicago: University of Chicago Press; & 1994 by Lincoln: University of Nebraska Press).
 
 Opler, Morris E. (1942). Myths and Tales of the Chiricahua Apache Indians. Memoirs of the American Folklore Society (No. 37). New York: American Folklore Society.
 
 
 
 Opler, Morris E. (1946). The Creative Role of Shamanism in Mescalero Apache Mythology.
 Opler, Morris E. (1946). Childhood and Youth in Jicarilla Apache Society. Los Angeles: The Southwest Museum.
 Opler, Morris E. (1947). Mythology and Folk Belief in the Maintenance of Jicarilla Apache Tribal Endogamy.
 
 
 
 
 
 Opler, Morris E. (1969). Apache odyssey: A journey between two worlds. New York: Holt, Rinehart & Winston.
 
 Opler, Morris E. (1971). "Pots, Apache, and the Dismal River culture aspect", In K. H. Basso & M. E. Opler (Eds.) (pp. 29–33).
 
 
 Opler, Morris E. (1983). The Apachean culture pattern and its origins. In A. Ortiz (Ed.), Handbook of North American Indians: Southwest (Vol. 10, pp. 368–392). Washington, D.C.: Smithsonian Institution.
 Opler, Morris E. (1983). Chiricahua Apache. In A. Ortiz (Ed.), Handbook of North American Indians: Southwest (Vol. 10, pp. 401–418). Washington, D.C.: Smithsonian Institution.
 Opler, Morris E. (1983). Mescalero Apache. In A. Ortiz (Ed.), Handbook of North American Indians: Southwest (Vol. 10, pp. 419–439). Washington, D.C.: Smithsonian Institution.
 Opler, Morris E. (2001). Lipan Apache. In R. J. DeMallie (Ed.), Handbook of North American Indians: Plains (Vol. 13, pp. 941–952). Washington, D.C.: Smithsonian Institution.
 
 Opler, Morris E.; & French, David H.  (1941).  Myths and tales of the Chiricahua Apache Indians.  Memoirs of the American Folklore Society, (Vol. 37).  New York: American Folklore Society.  (Reprinted in 1969 by New York: Kraus Reprint Co.; in 1970 by New York; in 1976 by Millwood, NY: Kraus Reprint Co.; & in 1994 under M. E. Opler, Morris by Lincoln: University of Nebraska Press.  ).

References

External links 
 Morris Opler
 Guide to the Morris Edward Opler Papers, Cornell University
 A Chiricahua Apache's Account of the Geronimo Campaign of 1886, University of Virginia Library E-Text
 Chiricahua and Mescalero Apache Texts
 "A description of a Tonkawa peyote meeting held in 1902", American Ethnography

1907 births
1996 deaths
20th-century American anthropologists
American ethnologists
University of Chicago alumni
Scientists from Buffalo, New York
Activists from Buffalo, New York
People of the United States Office of War Information
Claremont Colleges people
Cornell University faculty